The First Unitarian Universalist Society in Newton occupies a prominent location at 1326 Washington Street in the heart of the village of West Newton in Newton, Massachusetts. Architect Ralph Adams Cram designed the church, Frederick Law Olmsted Jr. designed the grounds, the cornerstone was laid in 1905, and it was dedicated in 1906; it is one of the village's oldest buildings.  The church is in Cram's signature Gothic Revival style, with buttressed walls and a blocky square tower with crenellations and spires.  An enclosed courtyard is formed by an office wing, banquet hall, and parish house, which are built to resemble Elizabethan architecture with brick first floor and half-timbered upper level.

The Unitarian Society was organized in 1848, and its first building was built in 1860.  A Gothic Revival structure later expanded with Stick style decoration, it stood at the present location of the West Newton Cinema.  The present building was built on the site of an early experimental normal school (later moved to Framingham and now Framingham State University, and has a stained glass window featuring two Massachusetts education pioneers (and parishioners of the church), Horace Mann and Cyrus Peirce.

The building was listed on the National Register of Historic Places as the First Unitarian Church in 1986.

See also
 National Register of Historic Places listings in Newton, Massachusetts

References

External links
 
 First Unitarian Universalist Society in Newton website
 Records of the Society are in the Andover-Harvard Theological Library at Harvard Divinity School in Cambridge, Massachusetts.
 Channing Church, Newton, Massachusetts
 Newton Universalist Society, 1871–1937, 1976
 Unitarian Church, Newton Centre, Mass. Records, 1881–1933; includes the Record Book of Stebbins Branch of the National Alliance, 1891–1916
 Scrapbook 

Churches in Newton, Massachusetts
Churches on the National Register of Historic Places in Massachusetts
Historic district contributing properties in Massachusetts
National Register of Historic Places in Newton, Massachusetts
Ralph Adams Cram church buildings
Stone churches in Massachusetts
Unitarian Universalist churches in Massachusetts